Mahadevi Birla World Academy, Park Circus, is located at 17A Darga Road Kolkata, India. Founded in 1959, it is an English medium, co-education school imparting education from upper-infant to twelfth standard, affiliated by the CBSE board. The school’s motto is "Tamaso Ma Jyotirgamay" ("Lead Us From Darkness To Light").

Controversy
The School has recently been in the news for making a U-turn on its decision to be a co-education School. The School was opened for boys in 2012 and in 2015 it backtracked on its decision and decided to become a Girl's School again. The decision attracted a lot of criticism from the parents of the boys already studying in the school. Parents protested in front of the School for its decision and demanded a rollback on 7 August 2015. The School was temporarily closed due to parents' agitation on 8 August 2015.

The school decided to continue as a co-ed in the future. Admission notice for 2016-2017 was given accordingly.

References

External links
 

Primary schools in West Bengal
High schools and secondary schools in West Bengal
Private schools in Kolkata
Educational institutions established in 1959
1959 establishments in West Bengal